Adnan Kassar (Arabic: عدنان القصار; born 1930) is a Lebanese banker, businessman and politician, who served at different cabinet posts.

Early life and education
Kassar was born into a Sunni family in Beirut in 1930. His father, Wafiq Kassar, was a prominent diplomat who served as the ambassador of Lebanon in Pakistan and Turkey.

He received a law degree from St. Joseph University in 1951.

Career
At age 25 Kassar managed to build a business partnership with China in 1955. In addition to being a businessman, he is a banker dealing finance investments. He has founded and owns various companies concerning trade, shipping and travel, and industry. He is one of the owners of the Banque Libano-Francaise together with Farid Raphael, his brother Nadim Kassar and Victor Kassir. Kassar acquired the bank in 1980.

Kassar served as the president of the Beirut Chamber of Commerce and Industry for nearly thirty years to which he was elected in January 1972. In June 1997, he became the president of the Federation of Chambers of Commerce, Industry and Agriculture in Lebanon. From 1999 to 2000, he headed the International Chamber of Commerce (ICC) based in Paris. On 1 January 2001, Richard D. McCormick, who served as his deputy at the ICC, succeeded Kassar as head of the ICC.

In January 2003, Kassar was appointed member of the patrons committee of the Anglo-Arab organisation. In addition, Kassar and his brother are shareholders of Fransabank, a large Lebanese commercial bank. As of 2013 Kassar was serving as the chairman of the bank. He was also chairman of the general union of Arab chambers of commerce, industry and agriculture and of Lebanon’s economic committees.

In October 2004, Kassar was appointed minister of economy and trade to the cabinet led by Prime Minister Omar Karami, replacing Marwan Hamadeh as economy minister. His tenure lasted until 2005 when Karami resigned from office due to the pressures exerted by Lebanese people as a protest over the assassination of Rafik Hariri. Kassar was succeeded by Demianos Khattah in the post. Later Kassar served as the minister of state in the cabinet led by Prime Minister Saad Hariri from November 2009 to 2011. Kassar was one of the cabinet members appointed by the Lebanese President Michel Suleiman.

Kassar has been regarded as a potential prime minister since the beginning of the 2000s.

Awards and honors
 Officier de la Legion d'honneur (France)
 Officer, National Order of the Cedar (Lebanon)
 Officer, National Order of Merit (France)
 Knight Commander, Order of Merit (Italy)
 Commander, Order of Rio Branco, (Brazil)

Kassar has also been given other awards, including, Commander of the Order of La Pléiade, Hungarian Order of Merit, and the prize of the Crans Montana Forum (2000). He is the recipient of the Business for Peace Award (2014) and was named as the honorary chairman of the Silk Road Chamber of International Commerce in 2016.

In April 2015 the School of Business at the Lebanese American University was named after Adnan Kassar.

Personal life
Kassar is married Raidaa Nathem Al Misqawi and has a daughter, Roula Kassar.

References

20th-century Lebanese businesspeople
21st-century Lebanese businesspeople
1930 births
Ministers without portfolio of Lebanon
Independent politicians in Lebanon
Leaders of organizations
Lebanese corporate directors
20th-century Lebanese lawyers
Lebanese Sunni Muslims
Living people
Officiers of the Légion d'honneur
People named in the Paradise Papers
Politicians from Beirut
Recipients of the National Order of the Cedar
Recipients of the Order of Merit of the Italian Republic
Saint Joseph University alumni
Government ministers of Lebanon